Neville Grant Walsh (born 1956)  has worked at the National Herbarium of Victoria from 1977.

Together with Don Foreman, he authored the first volume of Flora of Victoria, authoring a further two with Timothy Entwisle. while for Volume 4 all three shared the work.

He has published 112 names in more than 80 peer-reviewed papers (see scholia). He has served on the working group (vascular plants) for the Council of Heads of Australasian Herbaria since 2005, and in 2010 served as its taxonomic advisor on the Campanulaceae family. He has also contributed his knowledge of plant communities in the Victorian Alps to the Mountain Invasion Research Network.

Some taxa authored 
 Boronia citrata N.G.Walsh, Muelleria 8(1): 21 (1993). 
 Calotis pubescens (F.Muell. ex Benth.) N.G.Walsh & K.L.McDougall, Muelleria 16: 44 (2002).  
 Cassinia rugata N.G.Walsh, Muelleria 7(2): 141 (1990). 
 Centipeda aotearoana N.G.Walsh, Muelleria 15: 55 (2001).
 See also :Category:Taxa named by Neville Grant Walsh

References 

20th-century Australian botanists
Living people
1956 births
21st-century Australian botanists